Tuyuqchi (also Romanized as Ţūyūqchī; also known as Ţopoqchī) is a village in Dodangeh-ye Olya Rural District, Ziaabad District, Takestan County, Qazvin Province, Iran. In the 2006 census, its population was 791 residents in 211 families.

References 

Populated places in Takestan County